"A Lady of Letters" is a dramatic monologue written by Alan Bennett in 1987 for television, as part of his Talking Heads series for the BBC. The series became very popular, moving onto BBC Radio, international theatre, becoming one of the best-selling audio book releases of all time and included as part of both the A-level and GCSE English syllabus. It was the second episode of the first series of Talking Heads.

Storyline 

Irene Ruddock is a single, middle-aged woman living near Bradford and is not afraid to speak, or rather write, her mind. She frequently writes to her MP, the police, the chemist – everyone she can, to remedy the social ills she sees around her. Irene becomes suspicious of a neighbouring couple whom she suspects of neglecting their child, and tries to raise these suspicions to her doctor, who instead offers her a prescription (presumably some kind of anti-depressant or anti-psychotic medication) to help her forget her worries. Irene is eventually questioned by police after having written many abusive letters to the family, who, it emerges, were not neglecting the child but visiting him in hospital where he has just died of leukaemia. It is also revealed that Irene harassed the chemist through a series of letters (accusing his wife of being a prostitute) and finally had a court order taken out against her after a man she had accused of child molestation had a nervous breakdown. For her latest misconduct Irene receives a suspended sentence and is issued with social workers who try to help her find other interests; she is eventually gaoled after starting a new letter-writing campaign.

In prison, Irene makes new friends and develops a thriving social life, taking classes and gaining new skills in a secretarial course. She states that she feels truly happy, perhaps for the first time in her life. She speaks happily as she reviews the process of being released from prison. This could be taken as somewhat ironic, as earlier in the monologue she harshly criticizes the amenities in prison, comparing them to being on holiday. 

The end of the monologue finds Irene in a significantly darker mood and tone. Sitting next to an empty bed in a darkened cell with minimal light from a window, she explains that her cell mate often has nightmares of the child she killed, and Irene must comfort her in the night. This conclusion is presented in similar fashion to the dark shift in fate of the main character at the end of another monologue from the same series, called A Woman of No Importance, but it is unknown whether this darker shift in this monologue also means an unhappy end for Irene.

Reception

See also 

Talking Heads (series)
Alan Bennett
 English A-level and GCSEs

References

External links
Episode details

BBC television dramas
British television plays
BBC Radio 7 (rebranded) programmes
1987 plays
Monologues